Julia Nickson is a Singaporean–American actress. She first came to the attention of audiences in the United States in the Sylvester Stallone film Rambo: First Blood Part II. She appeared in the 2004 film Ethan Mao and in the 2008 independent film Half-Life.

Personal life
Nickson was married to actor/singer David Soul from 1987 to 1993. They have one daughter, China Soul, a singer/songwriter.

She was a practising Scientologist, having joined the Church of Scientology in 1996. She credited the organization with helping to improve her health. However in 2008, Nickson left the Church of Scientology.

Career
While attending the University of Hawaiʻi, Nickson was a model in Honolulu. There she appeared in her first play, The Winter's Tale. After acting classes, community theater, and roles on Magnum, P.I., she won the female lead in Rambo: First Blood Part II (1985). She appeared with Chuck Norris in Sidekicks (1992). 

Her other film appearances have included roles in Glitch! (1988), China Cry (1991), K2 (1992), Double Dragon (1994), White Tiger (1996), Devil in the Flesh (1998), Ethan Mao (2004), Half-Life (2008), Dim Sum Funeral (2008), and One Kine Day (2011).

Nickson guest starred in the final episode of seaQuest 2032 as Lieutenant Commander Heiko Kimura, a role that would have been a main character had the series continued, and in two Star Trek series: The Next Generation episode "The Arsenal of Freedom" as Enterprise-D crewmember Ensign Lian T'su, and the Deep Space Nine episode "Paradise" as Cassandra, a villager who attempts to seduce Commander Benjamin Sisko. She played Catherine Sakai, Commander Jeffrey Sinclair's love-interest, in the first season of Babylon 5. 

She had a recurring role as Dr. Susan Lee on the television series Walker, Texas Ranger (reuniting her with Chuck Norris), and as Princess Aouda in the 1989 miniseries version of Around the World in 80 Days opposite Pierce Brosnan and Eric Idle. She had a supporting role in the television version of the novel Noble House, again opposite Brosnan.

Filmography

Film

Television

References

External links

Year of birth missing (living people)
Living people
20th-century American actresses
20th-century Singaporean actresses
21st-century American actresses
21st-century Singaporean actresses
American female models
American film actresses
American people of English descent
American television actresses
American former Scientologists
Singaporean emigrants to the United States
Singaporean female models
Singaporean film actresses
Singaporean people of Chinese descent
Singaporean people of English descent
Singaporean television actresses
University of Hawaiʻi at Mānoa alumni
Hawaii people of Chinese descent